"Iancu de Hunedoara" National College (Colegiul Național "Iancu de Hunedoara") is a high school in Hunedoara, Romania.

Alumni 
Răzvan Lucescu (5–6th grades, 1980–1982)
Alexandru Iacob (2007)

References

Schools in Hunedoara County
Hunedoara
National Colleges in Romania
Educational institutions established in 1953
1953 establishments in Romania